Luiz Fux (born 26 April 1953) is a Brazilian judge and the former Chief Justice of the Supreme Federal Court. He is of Romanian Jewish descent, and the first Jewish Brazilian member of the Court. He was previously a minister of the Superior Court of Justice before assuming his position at the Supreme Court.

Legal career
After graduating from the law school of the then-State University of Guanabara (now State University of Rio de Janeiro) in 1976, Fux first served as an in-house counsel for Shell Brasil Petróleo Ltda. until 1978.

In 1983, Fux shifted his career to the Judiciary of the State of Rio de Janeiro as a judge of law, having achieved first position overall in the competitive bar examination. He was promoted by merit to the position of judge of law of the Entrância Especial, having been holder of the 9th Civil Court of the State of Rio de Janeiro. He served as electoral judge in the 13th Electoral Zone and 25th Electoral Zone in Rio de Janeiro. He was later promoted by merit to the position of judge of the Court of Jurisdiction of the State of Rio de Janeiro.

Career in the STJ
In 2001, Fux was chosen by then-President Fernando Henrique Cardoso to occupy the position of Justice (ministro) of the Superior Court of Justice (STJ) as the third judge of the Courts of Justice, in a vacancy left by Justice , who had retired. He was sworn in on 29 October 2001.

In 2003, Luiz Fux was the rapporteur of the trial in the Superior Court of Justice that legalised Tele Sena, reversing the decision of the Federal Court of the 3rd Region. In March 2005, Fux was admitted by President Luiz Inácio Lula da Silva to the Order of Military Merit in the degree of Special Commander.

Career in the STF and TSE
Fux was appointed as a Justice of the Supreme Federal Court (STF) by President Dilma Rousseff on 1 February 2011 to fill a vacancy left by the retirement of Justice  in August 2010, and had his nomination approved by the Senate nine days later. He took up his position in the STF on 3 March 2011. On 23 March 2011, Fux gave the decisive vote rendering the Lei da Ficha Limpa unconstitutional in its applicability to the 2010 Brazilian general election.

In an interview with Folha de S.Paulo on 2 December 2012, Fux revealed details of the lobbying effort that preceded his nomination to the Supreme Court by President Dilma Rousseff. Among his requests for political support, he included José Dirceu, Chief of Staff of President Lula, still an influential figure in the ruling Workers Party (PT), even after being accused in the Mensalão scandal. In several meetings, they discussed the forthcoming criminal trial in the Supreme Court, and decided the fate of those indicted in that corruption scandal. José Dirceu interpreted the conversations as a promise of acquittal by would-be justice. Once a member of the court, Justice Fux sided with the majority, voting to condemn most defendants, including José Dirceu himself.

Fux has also served as a member of the Superior Electoral Court (TSE) since 2014, and has also served as the TSE's vice-president from 2016 to 2017 and president in 2018.

Personal life
Fux has practiced Brazilian Jiu-Jitsu since the age of 26 and is currently an 8th degree white and red belt.

References

|-

|-

|-

Living people
1953 births
Brazilian Jews
Brazilian people of Romanian-Jewish descent
20th-century Brazilian judges
People from Rio de Janeiro (city)
Supreme Federal Court of Brazil justices
Brazilian practitioners of Brazilian jiu-jitsu
People awarded a coral belt in Brazilian jiu-jitsu
21st-century Brazilian judges